Rioteria is a genus of parasitic flies in the family Tachinidae.

Species
Rioteria flava Zeegers, 2007
Rioteria rufitibia (Mesnil, 1959)
Rioteria submacula Herting, 1973

References

Exoristinae
Diptera of Asia
Diptera of Europe
Diptera of Africa
Tachinidae genera